The Adamello-Presanella Alps Alpine group is a mountain range in the Southern Limestone Alps mountain group of the Eastern Alps. It is located in northern Italy, in the provinces of Trentino and Brescia. The name stems from its highest peaks: Adamello and Presanella.

The Adamello-Presanella Group is separated from the Ortler Alps in the north by the Tonale Pass; from the Bergamo Alps in the west by the Oglio valley (Val Camonica); from the Brenta Group in the east by the Campo Carlo Magno Pass and the river Sarca; to the south it continues towards Lake Iseo.

Peaks
The main peaks of the Adamello-Presanella Group are:

Passes
The main mountain passes of the Adamello-Presanella Group are:

See also
 Southern Limestone Alps
 Geography of the Alps

Southern Limestone Alps
Mountain ranges of the Alps
Mountain ranges of Lombardy
Mountain ranges of Trentino
Global Geoparks Network members
Geoparks in Italy